Jahromi is an Iranian surname.

Notable people with this surname include:
 Mehdi Shabzendedar Jahromi, Iranian Shia jurist
 Mohammad Jahromi, Iranian politician
 Mohammad-Javad Azari Jahromi, Iranian engineer
 Sajad Zareian Jahromi, Iranian squash player